The 2020–21 CBA season was the 26th season of the Chinese Basketball Association (CBA). All games were played in Zhuji, Zhejiang. The regular season was divided into four stages. The first stage began on 17 October 2020 and ended on 14 November 2020. The second stage began on 2 December 2020 and ended on 6 February 2021. The third stage began on 1 March 2021 and ended on 18 March 2021. The last stage began on 24 March 2021 and ended on 13 April 2021. The All-Star Game was played on 21 March 2021 in Qingdao. The playoffs began on 16 April 2021 and ended on 1 May 2021.

Changes from 2019–20 season
For this season, each team will play 56 games in the regular season. 20 teams are divided into two groups based on the ranking of the previous season. Each team will play against teams in their group four times and play against other teams twice.

Transactions

Free agents

Loan

Trades

Transfers

Teams

Managerial changes

Draft
The 2020 CBA Draft, the sixth edition of the CBA draft, took place on 21 August 2020 in Quanzhou, Fujian. 19 players were selected in the draft.

Foreign players

Import chart
This is the full list of international players competing in the CBA during the 2020–21 season.

Regular season

League table

Results
19 teams are divided into two groups based on the ranking of the previous season. Each team will play against teams in their group four times and play against other teams twice.

Playoffs

Bracket

First round

(5) Shandong Heroes vs. (12) Guangzhou Loong Lions

(6) Qingdao Eagles vs. (11) Sichuan Blue Whales

(7) Zhejiang Lions vs. (10) Jilin Northeast Tigers

(8) Shenzhen Aviators vs. (9) Beijing Ducks

Quarter-finals

(1) Guangdong Southern Tigers vs. (9) Beijing Ducks

(2) Liaoning Flying Leopards vs. (7) Zhejiang Lions

(3) Zhejiang Golden Bulls vs. (6) Qingdao Eagles

(4) Xinjiang Flying Tigers vs. (5) Shandong Heroes

Semi-finals

(1) Guangdong Southern Tigers vs. (5) Shandong Heroes

(2) Liaoning Flying Leopards vs. (3) Zhejiang Golden Bulls

Finals

(1) Guangdong Southern Tigers vs. (2) Liaoning Flying Leopards

Final standings

All-Star Weekend

Rising Stars Challenge

 Zheng Qilong was unable to participate due to injury.
 Zhao Yiming was selected as Zheng Qilong's replacement.

Skills Challenge

Three-Point Contest

Slam Dunk Contest

 Zheng Qilong was unable to participate due to injury.
 Zhang Hao was selected as Zheng Qilong's replacement.

All-Star Game

 Zhai Xiaochuan was unable to participate due to injury.
 Wang Shaojie was selected as Zhai Xiaochuan's replacement.

Statistics

Awards

Yearly awards
This is a list of the 2020–21 CBA season's yearly awards winners.

All-CBA Domestic First Team:
 F Hu Jinqiu, Zhejiang Lions
 F Shen Zijie, Shenzhen Aviators
 C Zhou Qi, Xinjiang Flying Tigers
 G Wu Qian, Zhejiang Golden Bulls
 G Zhao Jiwei, Liaoning Flying Leopards

All-CBA Domestic Second Team:
 F Zhou Peng, Guangdong Southern Tigers
 F Zhang Zhenlin, Liaoning Flying Leopards
 C Han Dejun, Liaoning Flying Leopards
 G Guo Ailun, Liaoning Flying Leopards
 G Zhao Rui, Guangdong Southern Tigers

All-CBA Foreign First Team:
 F  Dakari Johnson, Qingdao Eagles
 F  Donatas Motiejūnas, Xinjiang Flying Tigers
 C  Hamed Haddadi, Sichuan Blue Whales
 G  Lester Hudson, Shandong Heroes
 G  MarShon Brooks, Guangdong Southern Tigers

Players of the Week
This is a list of the 2020–21 CBA season's Player of the Week award winners.

Players of the Month
This is a list of the 2020–21 CBA season's Player of the Month award winners.

Young Players of the Month
This is a list of the 2020–21 CBA season's Young Player of the Month award winners.

Notes

References

External links
CBA Official Website
CBA China - 2020-21 Standings and Stats on Basketball-Reference.com

League
Chinese Basketball Association seasons
CBA